Live Bootleg is the first live album by American Christian rock band Resurrection Band, released in 1984.  It was the band's first release for Sparrow Records, and also their first under the shortened moniker "Rez Band."
Live Bootleg was the group's biggest selling album.

Recording history
Recorded at the Odeum Arena in Chicago over two nights, October 21 and 22, 1983, this album features a mixture of the band's most popular live tracks as well as two new songs: "Gameroom" and "Playground". The album also features the only time a song from one of the band's independent cassettes was ever re-recorded for one of their official releases ("Quite Enough"). "Gameroom" continues the trend begun on D.M.Z. of directly addressing the concerns of a high school aged audience, and the album closes with an evangelistic message from Glenn Kaiser, which was typical of the band's live performances.

Steve Taylor was Rez Band's opening act for this concert.

Track listing
 "Military Man"
 "Gameroom"
 "Wendi's Rap"
 "Playground"
 "Medley" ("Waves," "Awaiting Your Reply," "Broken Promises," "Autograph," "City Streets")
 "White Noise"
 "Quite Enough" 
 "Area 312"
 "Can't Stop Loving You"
 "Glenn's Rap"

"Quite Enough"  is a live version of a track from the band's first independent cassette, Music to Raise the Dead.

Personnel
 Glenn Kaiser - vocals, guitar, keyboards
 Wendi Kaiser - vocals
 Stu Heiss - guitar, keyboards
 Jim Denton - bass guitar, synthesizer
 John Herrin - drums, Simmons Drums

Production
 Rez Band – producer
 Phil Bonanno – engineer
 Roger Heiss – engineer
 Steve Hall – mastering

Further reading

References

Resurrection Band albums
1984 live albums